Ivan Maksymov (born 6 February 1963) is a Ukrainian biathlete. He competed in the men's sprint event at the 1994 Winter Olympics.

References

External links
 

1963 births
Living people
Ukrainian male biathletes
Olympic biathletes of Ukraine
Biathletes at the 1994 Winter Olympics
People from Zhmerynka
Sportspeople from Vinnytsia Oblast